Maggie Chan may refer to:
Maggie Chan Man Yee, Hong Kong long-distance runner
Maggie Chan (politician), Hong Kong solicitor and politician

See also
Maggie Chen, Hong Kong-born actress